The flora of Uruguay consists of 2,500 species distributed among 150 native and foreign biological families. Approximately 80% of Uruguay is prairie, with grasses predominating. Uruguay is primarily a grass-growing land, with vegetation that is essentially a continuation of the Argentine Pampas. Forest areas are relatively small. Trees grow in bunches.

Forested areas are much smaller than in the pampas, but contain a mix of hardwoods and softwoods, while eucalyptus were imported from Australia.
 

"Ceibo", or Erythrina cristagalli, is the national flower.

Herbs
Uruguay contains many herbs, ferns, and flowers.

Riverine forests
Natural forests in Uruguay mainly grow near rivers in the countryside.

The native forests are composed of more than 500 native species, including palms. The most abundant are "sauce criollo" (Salix humboldtiana), "sarandí colorado" (Cephalanthus glabratus), "sarandí blanco" (Phyllanthus sellowianus) and "mataojos" (Pouteria salicifolia).

Natural prairie 

The prairie includes Canelones, Colonia, San Jose, Flores, Florida, Lavalleja and Soriano.

In the prairies "Tala" (Celtis tala), "Molle rastrero" (Schinus longifolius), "Espina amarilla" (Berberis laurina) and "Coronilla" (Scutia buxifolia) thrive, and Cortaderia selloana can be found.

Native bushes
In the valleys, bush lands dominated by shrubs instead of trees or grasses predominate. Common native bushes include (Scutia buxifolia), "Arrayán" (Blepharocalyx salicifolius), "Chal-Chal" (Allophyllus edulis), and "Guayabo Colorado" (Eugenia cisplatensis).

Gallery

See also
 Fauna of Uruguay
 Uruguayan savanna

References

External links
national flower of Uruguay: Ceibo Erythrina
Vegetacion del Uruguay
Grupo Guayubira en Defensa del Monte Indigena
ElUruguayo.com Flora Geografía del Uruguay Enciclopedia
La Flora de Uruguay Easyviajar.com